It's Me, Eddie is the first novel by Russian writer and politician Eduard Limonov. 
The novel was written in New York in 1976, and published in Paris in 1979. When it was first published in Russia in 1991, it sold over a million copies.

Plot
The plot is fictional but based on real experiences Limonov faced during his immigration to New York City.

The protagonist is a man named Eddichka, a Russian immigrant in New York City. His wife has just divorced him, and he is collecting welfare whilst working at a restaurant. Eddichka attends Trotskyist meetings. The text of the novel uses obscenities and naturalistic descriptions of explicit sexual scenes.

Publishing history
The novel was repeatedly published in Russian, French, and English. The novel has been called "the quintessential novel of the third wave emigration".

Reception
Zakhar Prilepin offered effusive praise to It's Me, Eddie, stating that this is "a genius book about human freedom, love, passion ... I was simply killed by it". Prominent writer Dmitry Bykov described it as a confessional and hysterical book, although The Diary of a Loser is the more important artistic achievement of Limonov (“even more poetry ... in some things more frank and subtle”). The esteemed writer and intellectual Joseph Brodsky, who composed the advertising text for the cover of the American edition, noted in private conversations that Limonov's confession is nothing new in the context of American literature. 

The novel was mentioned in Adam Curtis's 2021 BBC documentary series Can't Get You Out of My Head.

References 

1976 Russian novels
Eduard Limonov